Rustam Usmanovich Muradov (born 21 March 1973) is a Russian military officer, serving as a Colonel General in the Russian Armed Forces. He is the current Commander of the Eastern Military District since October 5, 2022.  He was the Deputy Commander of the Southern Military District since December 2018 until October 2022. He was awarded the title Hero of the Russian Federation in 2017.

Early life 
Rustam Usmanovich Muradov was born in Chinar, Derbentsky District of the Dagestan ASSR within the Russian SFSR, then Soviet Union. Ethnically Tabasaran, his father Usman Muradov was born in Khanak in Tabasaransky District of the Dagestan ASSR but later moved with his parents north to Chinar, after the earthquake in southern Dagestan in 1966. There, he got married on Umizhat, and had three sons including Rustam.

Military career 

Muradov studied at the local Chinar high school. He then graduated from the Kazan Suvorov Military School. Being in military service since 1990, he graduated from the Leningrad Higher Combined Arms Command School and Combined Arms Academy of the Armed Forces of the Russian Federation with honors in 1995. In 2015, he graduated from the Military Academy of the General Staff of the Armed Forces of the Russian Federation.

In 1996, he was a platoon and company commander. In 2008, he was appointed the commander of the 242nd Motor Rifle Regiment, and until 2009, served as the commander of the 17th Separate Guards Motor Rifle Brigade. From 2009 to 2012, he was commander of the 36th Separate Guards Motor Rifle Brigade of the Eastern Military District. In 2012, he was promoted to a major general. From 2012 to 2013, he served as the head of the 473rd Lysychansk District Training Center of the Central Military District, located in the Sverdlovsk region of Russia ("Lysychanskaya" is an honorific given to a predecessor of one of the training academy's units, which participated in the liberation of the so-named Ukrainian city in 1943). From 2013 to 2015, he studied in the Military Academy of the General Staff of the Russian Armed Forces.

From 2015 to 2017, he served as the First Deputy Chief and Chief of Staff of the 41st Russian Combined Arms Army. In 2016, he was the representative of Russia at the Joint Russian-Ukrainian Center for Control and Coordination of Ceasefire and Stabilization of the Line of Delimitation of the Parties (JCCC) in Donbas. On 5 March 2016, in Donbas, Muradov, along with other representatives of the Russian side in the JCCC, came under fire for about 20 minutes.

In 2017, he was appointed as a military adviser in Syria. Muradov was awarded the title of Hero of the Russian Federation in the same year. Then, he served as the Commander of the 2nd Guards Red Banner Army of the Central Military District until Andrey Kolotovkin replaced him in 2018. Since then, he's the Deputy Commander of the Southern Military District. He was promoted to lieutenant general on 20 February 2020 by the decree of the President of Russia, Vladimir Putin.

On 11 November 2020, he was appointed the commander of the Russian peacekeeping forces in Nagorno-Karabakh, after a peace agreement ending the war over the region. He was replaced by Major General Mikhail Kosobokov on 9 September 2021.

War in Ukraine 
Muradov has been involved in the 2022 Russian invasion of Ukraine in several posts.
  
On October 7, 2022, General Muradov was appointed Commander of Eastern Military District.

In February 2023, Muradov came under fire for a failed offensive in the battle for Vuhledar, where reports of the loss of nearly 30 mostly intact infantry fighting vehicles and many Russian soldiers occurred.

Sanctions 
In February 2022, the European Union imposed personal sanctions against Muradov in connection with the Russian military operation in Ukraine. He was also sanctioned by New Zealand.

References

Bibliography
 Назначения в Вооружённых Силах. Генерал-майор Мурадов Рустам Усманович. // Российское военное обозрение. 2018. No. 1 (165). — С.70.
 Назначения в Вооружённых Силах. Генерал-майор Мурадов Рустам Усманович. // Российское военное обозрение. 2018. No. 12 (176). — С.70.

1973 births
Living people
People from Derbentsky District
Russian lieutenant generals
Russian colonel generals
Soviet Army personnel
Tabasaran people
People of the Chechen wars
Russian military personnel of the Syrian civil war
People of the 2020 Nagorno-Karabakh war
Russian military personnel of the 2022 Russian invasion of Ukraine
Russian individuals subject to European Union sanctions
Military Academy of the General Staff of the Armed Forces of Russia alumni
Heroes of the Russian Federation
Recipients of the Order of Courage
Recipients of the Order "For Merit to the Fatherland"
Recipients of the Medal of the Order "For Merit to the Fatherland" II class
Recipients of the Order of Military Merit (Russia)
Recipients of the Order of Alexander Nevsky